The Data Discman is an electronic book player introduced to the Western market in late 1991 or early 1992 by Sony Corporation.  It was marketed in the United States to college students and international travelers, but had little success outside Japan. The Discman product name had originally been applied to Sony's range of portable CD players such as the Sony Discman D-50, first released in 1984.

The Data Discman was designed to allow quick access to electronic reference information on a pre-recorded disc. Searching terms were entered using a QWERTY-style keyboard and utilized the "Yes" and "No" keys.

A typical Data Discman model has a low resolution small grayscale LCD (256x200 early on, later models would have up to 320x240 and in colour), CD drive unit (either Mini CD or full size), and a low-power computer. Early versions of the device were incapable of playing audio CDs. Software was prerecorded and usually featured encyclopedias, foreign language dictionaries and novels. It was typically created using the Sony Electronic Book Authoring System (SEBAS).

A DD-1EX Data Discman is in the permanent collection of the Victoria and Albert Museum and is currently displayed in the V&A's 20th Century Gallery. This early model did not include the ability to play sound.

An updated model, the DD-10EX, was released in 1992 or 1993. The accompanying manual gives a copyright date of 1992. Unlike the DD-1EX, the DD-10EX also had the ability to play audio files. The British version came with a disc containing the Thomson Electronic Directory for April 1992, plus another containing the Pocket Interpreter 5-language conversation book for travelers. A DD-10EX was included in an exhibition entitled The Book and Beyond: Electronic Publishing and the Art of the Book, held at the Victoria and Albert Museum, London, from April to October 1995. The exhibition also included a CD-ROM designed to be played on the Data Discman, entitled The Library of the Future and published in 1993.

The DD-1EX and DD-10EX both made use of a flip or clamshell form, while the flat, rectangular design of the DD-8 was closer to later e-book readers such as the Amazon Kindle.

See also 

 Sony Multimedia CD-ROM Player - a concurrent portable CD-ROM-based reader by Sony, incompatible with Data Discman media

References

External links 
 Techmoan: e-books in the '90s with Sony's Data Discman, YouTube, published on 5 July 2018

Sony products
Audiovisual introductions in 1992
Electronic paper technology